"All I Need to Know" is a song written by Steve Seskin and Mark Alan Springer, and recorded by American country music artist Kenny Chesney.  It was released in July 1995 as the second single and title track from his album of the same name. It peaked at number 8 in both the United States and Canada.

Content
The song is a positive ballad about the strength and security found in enduring love.

Critical reception
Deborah Evans Price, of Billboard magazine reviewed the song favorably saying that "Chesney delivers a strong performance." She states that Cheney's "voice has a down to earth warmth that can make the listeners feel that [he] is relating to their own stories."

Music video
The music was directed by Chuck Kuhn, and premiered on CMT on July 22, 1995, when CMT named it a "Hot Shot". It was the last video where Chesney had a mullet.

Chart positions
"All I Need to Know" debuted at number 65 on the U.S. Billboard Hot Country Singles & Tracks for the week of July 29, 1995.

Year-end charts

References

1995 singles
1995 songs
Kenny Chesney songs
Songs written by Steve Seskin
Songs written by Mark Alan Springer
Song recordings produced by Barry Beckett
BNA Records singles